Great Common may refer to:

Great Common, West Sussex
Great Common, Suffolk
Kingston Great Common, National Nature Reserve in Hampshire